Orthosilicic acid is an inorganic compound with the formula .  Although rarely observed, it is the key compound of silica and silicates and the precursor to other silicic acids .  Silicic acids play important roles in biomineralization and technology.

Isolation

Typically orthosilicic acid is assumed to be a product of the hydrolysis of the ortho esters , as is practiced in sol-gel syntheses.  These conditions are however too vigorous to allow isolation of the parent acid.

Orthosilicic acid can be produced by Pd-catalyzed hydrogenolysis of tetrabenzoxysilicon:

The acid was crystallized from a solution of dimethylacetamide and tetrabutylammonium chloride.  As established by X-ray crystallography, the chloride anions interact with the acid via hydrogen bonds.  Otherwise, the structure consists of the expected tetrahedral silicon center.

Reactions

Silicic acid readily condenses to give "higher" silicic acids including disilicic and cyclic-tetrasilicic acid:

These derivatives have also been characterized crystallographically.

Orthosilicic acid in plants
Silicon has been explored as a nutrient for plant growth, with silica comprising up to 10% of plant weight on a dry matter basis. Orthosilicic acid is of particular interest as it is thought to be the form in which plants uptake silicon from the soil, before being deposited as phytoliths throughout the plant, leading to research in the application of orthosilicic acid through foliar sprays to supplement plant growth. Studies have demonstrated that foliar application of stabilized orthosilicic acid can alleviate abiotic stressors such as drought, heavy metal toxicity, and salinity, resulting in increased yields. Additionally, applications of orthosilicic acid have been demonstrated to reduce fungal infections and disease in plants, suggesting the possibility of using stabilized orthosilicic acid as an alternative or complement to existing disease control measures. The mechanisms by which orthosilicic acid alleviates abiotic stress and controls diseases is not well understood; current theories advanced include the activation of plant defense reactions and the precipitation of silica in the apoplast of the plant.

Oceanic silicic acid 

Theoretical computations indicate that the dissolution of silica in water proceeds through the formation of a ·2 complex and then orthosilicic acid.
The biogeochemical cycle of silica is regulated by the  algae known as the diatoms.  These algae polymerise the silicic acid to so-called biogenic silica, used to construct their cell walls (called frustules).

In the uppermost water column the surface ocean is undersaturated with respect to dissolved silica, except for the Antarctic Circumpolar Current south of 55°S.

The dissolved silica concentration increases with increasing water depth, and along the conveyor belt from the Atlantic over the Indian into the Pacific Ocean.

References

Oxoacids
Silicon compounds